The 41st annual Toronto International Film Festival was held from 8 to 18 September 2016. The first announcement of films to be screened at the festival took place on 26 July. Almost 400 films were shown.

Awards
The festival's final awards were announced on 18 September.

Jury members

Platform Jury
The jury for the Platform section (in its second year) comprised Brian de Palma (American director), Mahamat-Saleh Haroun (Chadian director), and Zhang Ziyi (Chinese actress). The Platform section (named for Jia Zhangke's film Platform) consists of "12 films of high artistic merit that demonstrate a strong directorial vision". The jury awarded the $25,000 prize to Jackie.

Programmes
The following films were selected:

Gala presentations
 A Monster Calls by J. A. Bayona
 Arrival by Denis Villeneuve
 Deepwater Horizon by Peter Berg
 The Edge of Seventeen by Kelly Fremon Craig
 The Headhunter's Calling by Mark Williams
 The Journey Is the Destination by Bronwen Hughes
 Justin Timberlake + The Tennessee Kids by Jonathan Demme
 LBJ by Rob Reiner
 Loving by Jeff Nichols
 The Magnificent Seven by Antoine Fuqua
 Norman: The Moderate Rise and Tragic Fall of a New York Fixer by Joseph Cedar
 Planetarium by Rebecca Zlotowski
 The Promise by Terry George
 Queen of Katwe by Mira Nair
 The Rolling Stones Olé Olé Olé!: A Trip Across Latin America by Paul Dugdale
 The Secret Scripture by Jim Sheridan
 Snowden by Oliver Stone
 Strange Weather by Katherine Dieckmann
 Their Finest by Lone Scherfig
 A United Kingdom by Amma Asante

Special presentations
 150 Milligrams by Emmanuelle Bercot
 The Age of Shadows by Kim Jee-woon
 All I See Is You by Marc Forster
 American Honey by Andrea Arnold
 American Pastoral by Ewan McGregor
 Asura: The City of Madness by Kim Sung-soo
 Barakah Meets Barakah by Mahmoud Sabbagh
 Barry by Vikram Gandhi
 Below Her Mouth by April Mullen
 The Birth of a Nation by Nate Parker
 Birth of the Dragon by George Nolfi
 Bleed for This by Ben Younger
 The Bleeder by Philippe Falardeau
 Blue Jay by Alex Lehmann
 Brain on Fire by Gerard Barrett
 Brimstone by Martin Koolhoven
 Brotherhood by Noel Clarke
 Burn Your Maps by Jordan Roberts
 Carrie Pilby by Susan Johnson
 Catfight by Onur Tukel
 Christine by Antonio Campos
 City of Tiny Lights by Pete Travis
 The Commune by Thomas Vinterberg
 A Death in the Gunj by Konkona Sen Sharma
 Denial by Mick Jackson
 The Duelist by Aleksey Mizgirev
 Elle by Paul Verhoeven
 The Exception by David Leveaux
 Foreign Body by Raja Amari
 Frantz by François Ozon
 The Handmaiden by Park Chan-wook
 Harmonium by Kōji Fukada
 I Am Not Madame Bovary by Feng Xiaogang
 I, Daniel Blake by Ken Loach
 In Dubious Battle by James Franco
 It's Only the End of the World by Xavier Dolan
 The Journey by Nick Hamm
 King of the Dancehall by Nick Cannon
 La La Land by Damien Chazelle
 Leehom Wang's Open Fire Concert Film by Homeboy Music and Inc.
 The Limehouse Golem by Juan Carlos Medina
 Lion by Garth Davis
 The Long Excuse by Miwa Nishikawa
 Manchester by the Sea by Kenneth Lonergan
 Mascots by Christopher Guest
 Maudie by Aisling Walsh
 Mean Dreams by Nathan Morlando
 Neruda by Pablo Larraín
 Nocturnal Animals by Tom Ford
 The Oath by Baltasar Kormákur
 Orphan by Arnaud des Pallières
 Paris Can Wait by Eleanor Coppola
 Paterson by Jim Jarmusch
 Rage by Lee Sang-il
 (Re) Assignment by Walter Hill
 The Salesman by Asghar Farhadi
 Salt and Fire by Werner Herzog
 Sing by Garth Jennings
 Souvenir by Bavo Defurne
 Things to Come by Mia Hansen-Løve
 Toni Erdmann by Maren Ade
 Trespass Against Us by Adam Smith
 Two Lovers and a Bear by Kim Nguyen
 Una by Benedict Andrews
 Unless by Alan Gilsenan
 Voyage of Time by Terrence Malick
 Wakefield by Robin Swicord
 Weirdos by Bruce McDonald
 Window Horses by Ann Marie Fleming

Midnight Madness
 The Autopsy of Jane Doe by André Øvredal
 The Belko Experiment by Greg McLean
 Blair Witch by Adam Wingard
 Dog Eat Dog by Paul Schrader
 Free Fire by Ben Wheatley
 The Girl with All the Gifts by Colm McCarthy
 Headshot by Kimo Stamboel and Timo Tjahjanto
 Rats by Morgan Spurlock
 Raw by Julia Ducournau
 Sadako vs. Kayako by Kōji Shiraishi

Masters
 After the Storm by Hirokazu Kore-eda
 Afterimage by Andrzej Wajda
 Anatomy of Violence by Deepa Mehta
 The Bait by Buddhadeb Dasgupta
 The Beautiful Days of Aranjuez by Wim Wenders
 Certain Women by Kelly Reichardt
 Fire at Sea by Gianfranco Rosi
 Graduation by Cristian Mungiu
 Hissein Habré, A Chadian Tragedy by Mahamat-Saleh Haroun
 J: Beyond Flamenco by Carlos Saura
 Julieta by Pedro Almodóvar
 Land of the Gods by Goran Paskaljević
 Ma' Rosa by Brillante Mendoza
 The Net by Kim Ki-duk
 Never Ever by Benoît Jacquot
 Personal Shopper by Olivier Assayas
 Pinneyum by Adoor Gopalakrishnan
 A Quiet Passion by Terence Davies
 Safari by Ulrich Seidl
 Sieranevada by Cristi Puiu
 Sweet Dreams by Marco Bellocchio
 The Unknown Girl by Dardenne brothers
 We Can't Make the Same Mistake Twice by Alanis Obomsawin
 Yourself and Yours by Hong Sang-soo

Next Wave
 Divines by Houda Benyamina
 The Edge of Seventeen by Kelly Fremon Craig
 Handsome Devil by John Butler
 India in a Day by Richie Mehta
 Layla M. by Mijke de Jong
 Moonlight by Barry Jenkins
 A Wedding by Stephan Streker
 The Wedding Ring by Rahmatou Keïta
 Window Horses by Ann Marie Fleming

Documentaries
 Abacus: Small Enough to Jail by Steve James
 All Governments Lie: Truth, Deception and the Spirit of I. F. Stone by Fred Peabody
 Amanda Knox by Brian McGinn and Rod Blackhurst
 The B-Side: Elsa Dorfman's Portrait Photography by Errol Morris
 Beauties of the Night by María José Cuevas
 Before the Flood by Fisher Stevens
 Bezness as Usual by Alex Pitstra
 Black Code by Nicholas de Pencier
 Breaking Occupation by Brett Smith
 Chasing Trane: The John Coltrane Documentary by John Scheinfeld
 The Cinema Travellers by Shirley Abraham and Amit Madheshiya
 Citizen Jane: Battle for the City by Matt Tyrnauer
 Forever Pure by Maya Zinshtein
 Gaza Surf Club by Philip Gnadt and Mickey Yamine
 Giants of Africa by Hubert Davis
 Gimme Danger by Jim Jarmusch
 Girl Unbound by Erin Heidenreich
 Gringo: The Dangerous Life of John McAfee by Nanette Burstein
 I Am Not Your Negro by Raoul Peck
 I Called Him Morgan by Kasper Collin
 In Exile by Tin Win Naing
 India in a Day by Richie Mehta
 An Insignificant Man by Khushboo Ranka and Vinay Shukla
 Into the Inferno by Werner Herzog and Clive Oppenheimer
 The Ivory Game by Kief Davidson and Richard Ladkani
 Karl Marx City by Petra Epperlein and Michael Tucker
 Mali Blues by Lutz Gregor
 Mostly Sunny by Dilip Mehta
 Off Frame AKA Revolution Until Victory by Mohanad Yaqubi
 Politics, Instructions Manual by Fernando León de Aranoa
 The River of My Dreams: A Portrait of Gordon Pinsent by Brigitte Berman
 Rodnye by Vitaly Mansky
 The Sixth Beatle by Tony Guma and John Rose
 The Skyjacker's Tale by Jamie Kastner
 The Stairs by Hugh Gibson
 The Terry Kath Experience by Michelle Sinclair
 The War Show by Andreas Dalsgaard and Obaidah Zytoon
 Water and Sugar: Carlo Di Palma, the Colours of Life by Fariborz Kamkari

Contemporary World Cinema
 A Decent Woman by Lukas Valenta Rinner
 After Love by Joachim Lafosse
 The Animal's Wife by Víctor Gaviria
 Apprentice by Boo Junfeng
 Aquarius by Kleber Mendonça Filho
 Ayiti Mon Amour by Guetty Felin
 Blindness by Ryszard Bugajski
 Boundaries by Chloé Robichaud
 Brooks, Meadows and Lovely Faces by Yousry Nasrallah
 Death in Sarajevo by Danis Tanović
 Ember by Zeki Demirkubuz
 The Fixer by Adrian Sitaru
 Handsome Devil by John Butler
 Heaven Will Wait by Marie-Castille Mention-Schaar
 In Between by Maysaloun Hamoud
 Indivisible by Edoardo De Angelis
 Mahana by Lee Tamahori
 Marie Curie: The Courage of Knowledge by Marie Noëlle
 Mister Universo by Tizza Covi and Rainer Frimmel
 Past Life by Avi Nesher
 Pyromaniac by Erik Skjoldbjærg
 The Rehearsal by Alison Maclean
 The Road to Mandalay by Midi Z
 Santa & Andres by Carlos Lechuga
 Soul on a String by Zhang Yang
 Tamara and the Ladybug by Lucía Carreras
 Clair Obscur by Yeşim Ustaoğlu
 Tramps by Adam Leon
 Vaya by Akin Omotoso
 We Are Never Alone by Petr Vaclav
 The Wedding Ring by Rahmatou Keïta
 White Sun by Deepak Rauniyar
 The Women's Balcony by Emil Ben Shimon
 X500 by Juan Andrés Arango
 Zoology by Ivan I. Tverdovsky

Contemporary World Speakers
 The Animal's Wife by Víctor Gaviria
 Blindness by Ryszard Bugajski
 In Between by Maysaloun Hamoud
 Mahana by Lee Tamahori
 Past Life by Avi Nesher

Vanguard
 The Bad Batch by Ana Lily Amirpour
 Blind Sun by Joyce A. Nashawati
 Buster's Mal Heart by Sarah Adina Smith
 Colossal by Nacho Vigalondo
 Godspeed by Chung Mong-hong
 I Am the Pretty Thing That Lives in the House by Oz Perkins
 Interchange by Dain Iskandar Said
 Message from the King by Fabrice Du Welz
 My Entire High School Sinking into the Sea by Dash Shaw
 Nelly by Anne Émond
 Prevenge by Alice Lowe
 The Untamed by Amat Escalante
 Without Name by Lorcan Finnegan

Discovery
 ARQ by Tony Elliott
 Blessed Benefit by Mahmoud al Massad
 Boys in the Trees by Nicholas Verso
 Divines by Houda Benyamina
 The Empty Box by Claudia Sainte-Luce
 Flemish Heaven by Peter Monsaert
 The Fury of a Patient Man by Raúl Arévalo
 Godless by Ralitza Petrova
 The Giant by Johannes Nyholm
 Guilty Men by Iván D. Gaona
 The Happiest Day in the Life of Olli Mäki by Juho Kuosmanen
 Heartstone by Guðmundur Arnar Guðmundsson
 Hello Destroyer by Kevan Funk
 Hunting Flies by Izer Aliu
 In the Blood by Rasmus Heisterberg
 In the Radiant City by Rachel Lambert
 Jean of the Joneses by Stella Meghie
 Jeffrey by Yanillys Perez
 Jesús by Fernando Guzzoni
 Joe Cinque's Consolation by Sotiris Dounoukos
 Kati Kati by Mbithi Masya
 Katie Says Goodbye by Wayne Roberts
 The Levelling by Hope Dickson Leach
 Little Wing by Selma Vilhunen
 Mad World by Wong Chun
 Marija by Michael Koch
 A Wedding by Stephan Streker
 Old Stone by Johnny Ma
 Park by Sofia Exarchou
 Prank by Vincent Biron
 The Red Turtle by Michaël Dudok de Wit
 Sami Blood by Amanda Kernell
 Sand Storm by Elite Zexer
 Werewolf by Ashley McKenzie
 Wùlu by Daouda Coulibaly

Platform
 Daguerrotype by Kiyoshi Kurosawa
 Goldstone by Ivan Sen
 Heal the Living by Katell Quillévéré
 Hema Hema: Sing Me a Song While I Wait by Khyentse Norbu
 Home by Fien Troch
 Jackie by Pablo Larraín
 Lady Macbeth by William Oldroyd
 Layla M. by Mijke de Jong
 Searchers by Zacharias Kunuk and Natar Ungalaaq
 Moonlight by Barry Jenkins
 Nocturama by Bertrand Bonello
 Those Who Make Revolution Halfway Only Dig Their Own Graves by Mathieu Denis and Simon Lavoie

TIFF Kids
The Day My Father Became a Bush, by Nicole van Kilsdonk
The Eagle Huntress by Otto Bell
My Life as a Zucchini by Claude Barras
Miss Impossible by Emilie Deleuze

Short Cuts
 3-Way (Not Calling) by Molly McGlynn
 5 Films About Technology by Peter Huang
 Andy Goes In by Josh Polon
 Ape Sodom by Maxwell McCabe-Lokos
 Because The World Never Stops by Axel Danielson and Maximilien Van Aertryck
 Black Head Cow by Elizabeth Nichols
 Blind Vaysha by Theodore Ushev
 Cleo by Sanja Zivkovic
 Cul-de-Sac by Damon Russell
 Gods Acre by Kelton Stepanowich
 Half a Man by Kristina Kumric
 Hand. Line. Cod. by Justin Simms
 The Hedonists by Jian Zhang-ke
 Imitations by Markus Henkel, Milos Mitrovic, Ian Bawa and Fabian Velasco
 Import by Ena Sendijarevic
 Inner Workings by Leo Matsuda
 Late Night Drama by Patrice Laliberté
 Mariner by Thyrone Tommy
 Mutants by Alexandre Dostie
 A New Home by Ziga Virc
 Next by Elena Brodach
 Nothing About Moccasins by Eden Mallina Awashish
 Oh What a Wonderful Feeling by François Jaros
 On the Origin of Fear by Bayu Prihantoro Filemon
 Plain and Simple by Raphaël Ouellet
 Red of the Yew Tree by Marie-Hélène Turcotte
 The Road to Webequie by Ryan Noth and Tess Girard
 Romantik by Mateusz Rakowicz
 The Smoke by Rebecca Addelman
 Snip by Terril Calder
 Standby by Charlotte Regan
 Summer Camp Island by Julia Pott
 Transition by Milica Tomovic
 Tshiuetin by Caroline Monnet
 Wild Skin by Ariane Louis-Seize
 Your Mother and I by Anna Maguire

Festival Street
 Ferris Bueller's Day Off by John Hughes
 Labyrinth by Jim Henson
 The Man Trap by Marc Daniels

Primetime
 Black Mirror by Charlie Brooker
 Nirvanna the Band the Show by Matt Johnson and Jay McCarrol
 Transparent by Jill Soloway
 Tuko Macho by The Nest Collective and Jim Chuchu
 Wasteland by Štěpán Hulík

Public Programme
 Ferris Bueller's Day Off by John Hughes

Cinematheque
 The Battle of Algiers by Gillo Pontecorvo
 A Cool Sound from Hell by Sidney J. Furie
 Daughters of the Dust by Julie Dash
 General Report on Certain Matters of Interest For a Public Screening by Pere Portabella
 The Horse Thief by Tian Zhuangzhuang
 Lumière! by Auguste and Louis Lumière and Thierry Frémaux
 One Sings, the Other Doesn't by Agnès Varda
 One-Eyed Jacks by Marlon Brando
 Pan's Labyrinth by Guillermo del Toro
 Something Wild by Jonathan Demme

City to City: Lagos
 '76 by Izu Ojukwu
 93 Days by Steve Gukas
 The Arbitration by Niyi Akinmolayan
 Green White Green by Abba Makama
 Just Not Married by Uduak-Obong Patrick
 Okafor's Law by Omoni Oboli
 Taxi Driver by Daniel Emeke Oriahi
 The Wedding Party by Kemi Adetiba

Wavelengths
 025 Sunset Red by Laida Lertxundi
 350 MYA by Terra Long
 As Without So Within by Manuela de Laborde
 Austerlitz by Sergei Loznitsa
 An Aviation Field by Joana Pimenta
 Ayhan and Me by Belit Sag
 Burning Mountains that Spew Flame by Helena Girón and Samuel M. Delgado
 By the Time It Gets Dark by Anocha Suwichakornpong
 Children of Lir by Katherin McInnis
 Cilaos by Camilo Restrepo
 Dark Adaptation by Chris Gehman
 The Death of Louis XIV by Albert Serra
 The Dreamed Ones by Ruth Beckermann
 The Dreamed Path by Angela Schanelec
 Ears, Nose and Throat by Kevin Jerome Everson
 Flowers of the Sky by Janie Geiser
 Foyer by Ismaïl Bahri
 General Report II: The New Abduction of Europe by Pere Portabella
 Hermia & Helena by Matías Piñeiro
 The Human Surge by Eduardo Williams
 Há Terra! by Ana Vaz
 I Had to Nowhere to Go by Douglas Gordon
 I'll Remember You As You Were, Not As What You'll Become by Sky Hopinka
 Incantati by Danièle Huillet and Jean-Marie Straub
 Indefinite Pitch by James N. Kienitz Wilkins
 Kékszakállú by Gastón Solnicki
 Luna e Santur by Joshua Gen Solondz
 Mimosas by Oliver Laxe
 Nightlife by Cyprien Gaillard
 The Ornithologist by João Pedro Rodrigues
 Rudzienko by Sharon Lockhart
 Singularity by Albert Serra
 Strange Vision of Seeing Things by Ryan Ferko
 Ta'ang by Wang Bing
 Ten Mornings Ten Evenings and One Horizon by Tomonari Nishikawa
 Untitled by Björn Kämmerer
 Untitled, 1925 by Madi Piller
 Venus Delta by Antoinette Zwirchmayr
 The Watershow Extravaganza by Sophie Michael
 What's New by Nina Könnemann
 The Woman Who Left by Lav Diaz

Canada's Top Ten
In December, TIFF programmers released their annual Canada's Top Ten list of the films selected as the ten best Canadian films of 2016. The selected films received a follow-up screening at the TIFF Bell Lightbox as a "Canada's Top Ten" minifestival in January 2017, as well as in selected other cities including Vancouver, Calgary, Edmonton, Regina, Saskatoon, Winnipeg, Ottawa, Montreal and Halifax.

Features

Short films

References

External links

 Official site
 2016 Toronto International Film Festival at IMDb

2016
2016 film festivals
2016 in Toronto
2016 in Canadian cinema
2016 festivals in North America